Magsad Isayev (born 7 June 1994) is an Azerbaijani footballer who plays as a defender for Gabala FK in the Azerbaijan Premier League.

Club career
On 30 November 2013, Isayev made his debut in the Azerbaijan Premier League for Neftçi Baku match against Sumgayit.

On 18 June 2021, Isayev signed for Gabala FK on a two-year contract.

Career statistics

Club

Honours

Club
Neftçi
 Azerbaijan Cup: 2013–14

Keşla
 Azerbaijan Cup: 2017–18

International
Azerbaijan U23
 Islamic Solidarity Games: (1) 2017

References

External links
 

1994 births
Living people
Association football defenders
Azerbaijani footballers
Azerbaijan youth international footballers
Azerbaijan under-21 international footballers
Azerbaijan Premier League players
Neftçi PFK players
Shamakhi FK players
Sabah FC (Azerbaijan) players
Sabail FK players